ZeroC is a software company based in Jupiter, Florida, United States.

The company develops and publishes tools for software developers.  Its main product is Ice, an open-source RPC framework that helps software developers build distributed applications. Ice and related products are open-source and can be downloaded from GitHub or the company's web site.

Products
 Ice
 Ice Touch, a variant of Ice for iOS devices

External links
 
 

Companies based in Palm Beach County, Florida
Software companies of the United States
Free software companies